The following elections occurred in the year 1921.

 1921 Belgian general election
 1921 Italian general election
 1921 Northern Ireland general election
 1921 Norwegian parliamentary election

Africa
 1921 South African general election

Asia
 1921 Ceylonese Legislative Council election
 1921 Persian legislative election

Americas
 Canada
 1921 Canadian federal election
 1921 Alberta general election
 1921 Edmonton municipal election
 1921 Saskatchewan general election
 1921 Toronto municipal election
 1921 Guatemalan presidential election
 United States
 1921 New York state election
 1921 North Dakota recall election

Europe
 1921 Belgian general election
 Irish elections
 1921 Northern Ireland general election
 Italian general election
 Norwegian parliamentary election
 1921 Portuguese legislative election
 Free State of Prussia (Germany): Landtag of Prussia election
 1921 Swedish general election
 United Kingdom: 
 1921 Bedford by-election
 1921 Orkney and Shetland by-election
 1921 Cardiganshire by-election
 1921 East Dorset by-election
 1921 Lewisham West by-election
 1921 Louth by-election
 1921 Northern Ireland general election
 1921 Penistone by-election
 1921 Penrith and Cockermouth by-election
 1921 Southwark South East by-election
 1921 Westminster Abbey by-election
 1921 Woolwich East by-election

Oceania

Australia
 1921 South Australian state election

New Zealand
 1921 Auckland East by-election
 1921 Patea by-election

See also
 :Category:1921 elections

1921
Elections